The Madrid Confederation of Employers and Industries (CEIM in its Spanish acronym) is an organization that represents the business owners of Madrid, Spain.

History 
Several groups of business led by Max Mazin formed Independent Employers Association (AEI) and later Madrid Independent Employers Association (AEIM). In Madrid the Madrid Employers Federation (FEM) and Federation of Employers' Associations of Madrid (FAEM) joined with AEIM and formed CEIM on 28 February 1978.  The first president was Jose Antonio Segurado.

Governance

Presidents 
 José Antonio Segurado (1978–1985)
 Fernando Fernández-Tapias (1985–2002)
 Gerardo Díaz Ferrán (2002–2007)
 Arturo Ferández

Generals secretary 
 Agustin Mascareñas (1978–2000)
 Alejandro Couceiro (2000- )

General Assembly 
The representative organ of the Confederation. It is formed by organisations and companies.

Board of directors 
It is formed by people chosen in General Assembly.

Executive committee 
It is formed by the president, vice-president, the treasurer, the accountant and the representatives

Assessments 
The board of assessors is formed by Advisory council, council of presidents, and the work commissions.

Advisory council 
It assesses the president.

Council of presidents 
The council of presidents comprises the regional and sectional presidents along with the national Vice-President, Treasurer and Accountant.

Work commissions 
Work commissions study affairs about which governing members must make decisions.

Departments 
The CEIM assesses, informs and supports Madrid businessmen about the following topics:
 Economy
 Labour
 Training
 International trade
 Innovation
 Urbanism
 Communication

References

External links
 Official website

1978 establishments in Spain
Employers' organizations
Economy of Madrid
Organizations established in 1978
Industry in Spain
Organisations based in Madrid